Juan Luis Riado López (born 24 July 1956) is a Spanish former footballer who played as a midfielder.

Riado made his debut at 19 for AD Almería against Sevilla Atlético for Segunda División B. He joined to RCD Mallorca on 1980–1981 and spend many season on this club, winning the 1980–81 Segunda División B title, and playing the 1983–84 La Liga season.

References

1956 births
Living people
Sportspeople from the Province of Almería
Spanish footballers
Footballers from Andalusia
Association football midfielders
La Liga players
Segunda División players
Segunda División B players
Divisiones Regionales de Fútbol players
Palencia CF players
RCD Mallorca players
Elche CF players
UD Poblense players